Australaria is a genus of sea snails, marine gastropod mollusks in the family Fasciolariidae, the spindle snails, the tulip snails and their allies.

Species
Species within the genus Australaria include:
 Australaria australasia (Perry, 1811)
 Australaria bakeri (Gatliff & Gabriel, 1912)
 Australaria coronata (Lamarck, 1822)
 Australaria eucla (Cotton, 1953)
 Australaria fusiformis (Kiener, 1840)
 Australaria tenuitesta Snyder, Vermeij & Lyons, 2012

References

 Snyder M.A., Vermeij G.J. & Lyons W.G. (2012) The genera and biogeography of Fasciolariinae (Gastropoda, Neogastropoda, Fasciolariidae). Basteria 76(1-3): 31-70

Fasciolariidae